The pelagic zone consists of the water column of the open ocean and can be further divided into regions by depth. The word pelagic is derived . The pelagic zone can be thought of as an imaginary cylinder or water column between the surface of the sea and the bottom. Conditions in the water column change with depth: pressure increases; temperature and light decrease; salinity, oxygen, micronutrients (such as iron, magnesium and calcium) all change. Somewhat analogous to stratification in the Earth's atmosphere, but depending on how deep the water is, the water column can be divided vertically into up to five different layers (illustrated in the diagram).

Marine life is affected by bathymetry (underwater topography) such as the seafloor, shoreline, or a submarine seamount, as well as by proximity to the boundary between the ocean and the atmosphere at the ocean surface, which brings light for photosynthesis, predation from above, and wind stirring up waves and setting currents in motion. The pelagic zone refers to the open, free waters away from the shore, where marine life can swim freely in any direction unhindered by topographical constraints.

The oceanic zone is the deep open ocean beyond the continental shelf, which contrasts with the inshore waters near the coast, such as in estuaries or on the continental shelf. Waters in the oceanic zone plunge to the depths of the abyssopelagic and further to the hadopelagic. Coastal waters are generally the relatively shallow epipelagic. Pelagic life decreases as depth increases. 

The pelagic zone contrasts with the benthic and demersal zones at the bottom of the sea. The benthic zone is the ecological region at the very bottom, including the sediment surface and some subsurface layers. Marine organisms such as clams and crabs living in this zone are called benthos. Just above the benthic zone is the demersal zone. Demersal fish can be divided into benthic fish, which are denser than water and rest on the bottom, and benthopelagic fish, which swim just above the bottom. Demersal fish are also known as bottom feeders and groundfish.

Depth and layers
The pelagic zone is subdivided into five vertical regions. From the top down, these are:

Epipelagic (sunlight)

The illuminated zone at the surface of the sea with sufficient light for photosynthesis. Nearly all primary production in the ocean occurs here, and marine life is concentrated in this zone, including plankton, floating seaweed, jellyfish, tuna, many sharks and dolphins.

Mesopelagic (twilight)

The most abundant organisms thriving into the mesopelagic zone are heterotrophic bacteria. Animals living in this zone include swordfish, squid, wolffish and some species of cuttlefish. Many organisms living here are bioluminescent. Some mesopelagic creatures rise to the epipelagic zone at night to feed.

Bathypelagic (midnight)

The name stems . The ocean is pitch black at this depth apart from occasional bioluminescent organisms, such as anglerfish. No plants live here. Most animals survive on detritus known as "marine snow" falling from the zones above or, like the marine hatchetfish, by preying on other inhabitants of this zone. Other examples of this zone's inhabitants are giant squid, smaller squid and the grimpoteuthis or "dumbo octopus". The giant squid is hunted here by deep-diving sperm whales.

Abyssopelagic (abyssal zone)

The name is derived  - a holdover from times when the deep ocean was believed to indeed be bottomless. Among the very few creatures living in the cold temperatures, high pressures and complete darkness here are several species of squid; echinoderms including the basket star, swimming cucumber, and the sea pig; and marine arthropods including the sea spider. Many species at these depths are transparent and eyeless.

Hadopelagic (hadal zone)

The name is derived from the realm of Hades, the Greek underworld. Such depths are generally located in trenches.

Pelagic ecosystem
The pelagic ecosystem is based on phytoplankton. Phytoplankton manufacture their own food using a process of photosynthesis. Because they need sunlight, they inhabit the upper, sunlit epipelagic zone, which includes the coastal or neritic zone. Biodiversity diminishes markedly in the deeper zones below the epipelagic zone as dissolved oxygen diminishes, water pressure increases, temperatures become colder, food sources become scarce, and light diminishes and finally disappears.

Pelagic invertebrates
Some examples of pelagic invertebrates include krill, copepods, jellyfish, decapod larvae, hyperiid amphipods, rotifers and cladocerans.

Thorson's rule states that benthic marine invertebrates at low latitudes tend to produce large numbers of eggs developing to widely dispersing pelagic larvae, whereas at high latitudes such organisms tend to produce fewer and larger lecithotrophic (yolk-feeding) eggs and larger offspring.

Pelagic fish

Pelagic fish live in the water column of coastal, ocean, and lake waters, but not on or near the bottom of the sea or the lake. They can be contrasted with demersal fish, which do live on or near the bottom, and coral reef fish.

Pelagic fish are often migratory forage fish, which feed on plankton, and the larger predatory fish that follow and feed on the forage fish. Examples of migratory forage fish are herring, anchovies, capelin, and menhaden. Examples of larger pelagic fish which prey on the forage fish are billfish, tuna, and oceanic sharks.

Pelagic reptiles

Pelamis platura, the pelagic sea snake, is the only one of the 65 species of marine snakes to spend its entire life in the pelagic zone. It bears live young at sea and is helpless on land. The species sometimes forms aggregations of thousands along slicks in surface waters. The pelagic sea snake is the world's most widely distributed snake species.

Many species of sea turtles spend the first years of their lives in the pelagic zone, moving closer to shore as they reach maturity.

Pelagic birds

Pelagic birds, also called oceanic birds or seabirds, live on open seas and oceans rather than inland or around more restricted waters such as rivers and lakes. Pelagic birds feed on planktonic crustaceans, squid and forage fish. Examples are the Atlantic puffin, macaroni penguins, sooty terns, shearwaters, and Procellariiformes such as the albatross, Procellariidae and petrels.

References

Further reading
 Ryan, Paddy "Deep-sea creatures" Te Ara – the Encyclopedia of New Zealand, updated 21 September 2007
 "Pelagic-zone (oceanography)" Encyclopædia Britannica Online. 21 March 2009.
 Grantham HS, Game ET, Lombard AT, et al. (2011) "Accommodating Dynamic Oceanographic Processes and Pelagic Biodiversity in Marine Conservation Planning" PLOS One 6(2): e16552. .
 

Aquatic biomes
Fisheries science
Oceanographical terminology
Oceanography